William Joseph Patrick O'Brien (November 11, 1899 – October 15, 1983) was an American film actor with more than 100 screen credits. Of Irish descent, he often played Irish and Irish-American characters and was referred to as "Hollywood's Irishman in Residence" in the press. One of the best-known screen actors of the 1930s and 1940s, he played priests, cops, military figures, pilots, and reporters. He is especially well-remembered for his roles in Knute Rockne, All American (1940), Angels with Dirty Faces (1938), and Some Like It Hot (1959). He was frequently paired onscreen with Hollywood star James Cagney. O'Brien also appeared on stage and television.

Early life
O'Brien was born in 1899 to an Irish-American Catholic family in Milwaukee, Wisconsin. All four of his grandparents had come from Ireland. The O'Briens were originally from County Cork. His grandfather, Patrick O'Brien, for whom he was named, was an architect who was killed while trying to break up a saloon fight in New York City. His mother's parents, the McGoverns, emigrated from County Galway in the west of Ireland in the mid- to late-19th century.

As a child, O'Brien served as an altar boy at Gesu Church, while growing up near 13th and Kilbourn Streets in Milwaukee. He attended Marquette Academy with fellow actor Spencer Tracy, who was a lifelong friend. During World War I, O'Brien and Tracy joined the United States Navy. They both attended boot camp at the Great Lakes Naval Training Center, but they never went to sea.  The war ended before their training had finished.

Jack Benny was also at the Great Lakes Naval Training Center at the same time as O'Brien and Tracy. According to his autobiography, Benny performed a number on the violin at a show one evening, when the sailors started booing and heckling him. O'Brien walked on stage and whispered in his ear, "For heaven's sake, Ben, put down the damn fiddle and talk to 'em." Benny stopped playing his violin and made a series of comments that got laughs from the audience. In this way, O'Brien indirectly helped to start Benny's career in comedy.

After the war, O'Brien finished his secondary schooling at Marquette Academy and later attended Marquette University. While still at college, he decided to seek work as an actor. He and Spencer Tracy  moved to New York, where they both attended the American Academy of Dramatic Arts. The two struggling young actors shared a small studio apartment, and began their careers on the stage.

Early career
O'Brien spent a decade in plays on Broadway and in the New York City area.

O'Brien made his film debut in the Vitaphone Varieties short film, The Nightingale, produced in New York and released in August 1930. His first starring role was as ace reporter Hildy Johnson in the original 1931 version of The Front Page with Adolphe Menjou. In 2010, this film was selected by the National Film Preservation Board for preservation in the Library of Congress's National Film Registry as being "culturally, historically, or aesthetically significant."

He was the lead in Paramount's Personal Maid (1931), and appeared in a Metro-Goldwyn-Mayer musical Flying High (1931), supporting Bert Lahr. He was Irene Dunne's love interest in RKO's Consolation Marriage (1932), then co-starred opposite a young Bette Davis in Hell's House (1932). O'Brien stayed in leads, going from studio to studio: Scandal for Sale (1932), at Universal; The Strange Case of Clara Deane (1932), at Paramount; Hollywood Speaks (1932), American Madness (1932) and  Virtue (1932).

O'Brien played a heroic pilot in Universal's Air Mail (1932), directed by John Ford. While at that studio he was in the compelling Laughter in Hell (1932) and Destination Unknown (1933). At the small Majestic Pictures he starred in The World Gone Mad (1933).

Warner Bros

O'Brien's first Warner Bros. movie was Bureau of Missing Persons (1933), starring Bette Davis. He went to RKO for Flaming Gold (1933) and MGM for Bombshell (1933), then Warners signed O'Brien to a long-term contract. He would remain with the studio until 1940, when he left after a dispute over the terms of his contract renewal.

O'Brien supported Dick Powell in College Coach (1933) and Joan Blondell in I've Got Your Number (1934). He was third lead to Barbra Stanwyck and Joel McCrea in Gambling Lady (1934), then was with Powell again in Twenty Million Sweethearts (1934).

Here Comes the Navy (1934) was O'Brien's first film with James Cagney, also under contract to Warners. The two originally met in 1926 and remained friends for almost six decades. After O'Brien's death, Cagney referred to him as his "dearest friend." O'Brien played the lead, a boxer, in The Personality Kid (1934), supported Powell in Flirtation Walk (1934) and was an auctioneer in I Sell Anything (1935).

Cagney and O'Brien were reteamed in Devil Dogs of the Air (1935). He was a critic in love with Dolores del Río in In Caliente (1935) and had the lead in the bio-pic Oil for the Lamps of China (1935), which he called "one of my favorite pictures." "That was a sweetheart," he said.

He and Cagney were in The Irish in Us (1935) then it was back to supporting Powell in Page Miss Glory (1935). He headlined a musical Stars Over Broadway (1935) then was back with Cagney for Howard Hawks' Ceiling Zero (1935). Cagney later sued Warners for billing O'Brien's name above his.

"Jimmy's grand to work with," said O'Brien in 1935. "You couldn't ask for a better partner but there's a limit to all that. I think one picture a year with Jimmy would be fine. But as it is I've been with him in every uniform – the army, the navy, the police, the marines, the air corps – and it's always a case of me falling for his girl or him falling for mine. It gets tiresome... I don't just want to be a fast-talking Charlie all my life."

Warners gave him some starring parts: I Married a Doctor (1936), Public Enemy's Wife (1936), China Clipper (1936), The Great O'Malley (1937), and Slim (1937) with Henry Fonda. He was Captain of the  Guard (on special leave from the US Army) in San Quentin (1937) opposite Humphrey Bogart, romanced Blondell in Back in Circulation (1937) and was an veteran  sailor in Submarine D-1 (1938).

O'Brien was pulled out of Swing Your Lady to co-star with Kay Francis in Women Are Like That (1938) and was back with Powell for Cowboy from Brooklyn (1938). He and Cagney reteamed for Boy Meets Girl (1938), and he was meant to be back with Powell in Garden of the Moon (1938), but Powell refused to do it – he was replaced by John Payne.

O'Brien has one of his best ever roles as the former street kid turned priest in Angels with Dirty Faces (1938) with Cagney. He was with Blondell in Off the Record (1939) and The Kid from Kokomo (1939), and co-starred  with Gale Page in Indianapolis Speedway (1939).

He went over to Paramount for The Night of Nights (1939), part of a deal in which Warners bought the rights to The Old Maid from Paramount. He then made Slightly Honorable (1939) for United Artists.

Back at Warner Bros he was reunited with Cagney for The Fighting 69th (1940) then made Castle on the Hudson (1940) with Sheridan and John Garfield. He was a cop in 'Til We Meet Again (1940), with Cagney and Sheridan in Torrid Zone (1940). He co-starred with Garfield and Frances Farmer in Flowing Gold (1940).

O'Brien was then given his best known role, as the famous University of Notre Dame football coach Knute Rockne in Knute Rockne, All American (1940). In the film, he gave the speech to "win just one for the Gipper," referring to recently deceased football player, George Gipp, portrayed in the film by a young Ronald Reagan. Reagan later used this saying as a slogan for his campaign for president in 1980.

O'Brien was at a career peak. He was considered for the role of Alvin York in the film Sergeant York. From this high point, however, O'Brien left Warner Bros in July 1940.

Leaving Warner Bros

After he left Warner Bros. in 1940, O'Brien signed a contract with 20th Century Fox for two films a year. However they ended up not using him.

He signed with Columbia Pictures to make two films a year. He was in Escape to Glory (1940), then was idle for a year before making Two Yanks in Trinidad (1942) with Brian Donlevy and Flight Lieutenant (1942) with Glenn Ford. At Universal he was in Broadway (1942) with George Raft.

RKO
Soon he signed a contract with RKO and appeared in several movies for that studio. He mostly played authority/military roles such as The Navy Comes Through (1942), and Bombardier (1943). The Iron Major (1943) was an attempt to repeat the success of Knute Rockne with O'Brien as Frank Cavanaugh.
At Universal he supported Deanna Durbin in Frank Borzage's His Butler's Sister (1943) then it was back to RKO for Marine Raiders (1944).

With his agent Phil Ryan, O'Brien set up his own production company, Teneen Productions. They signed a deal with Columbia to make a film with O'Brien, Secret Command (1944). (In 1955 the IRS would sue him for earnings on this film.) At RKO he did Having Wonderful Crime (1946) and Man Alive (1945). For Columbia he made Perilous Holiday (1946).

In 1946 he starred in the successful film noir suspense film, Crack-Up. He was in a thriller, Riffraff (1947) and another biopic Fighting Father Dunne (1948).  He followed it with The Boy with Green Hair (1948), and A Dangerous Profession (1949) with Raft.

While working as a Hollywood contract player, O'Brien made occasional appearances on the radio in the 1930s and 1940s. In the summer of 1947, he starred with Lynn Bari in Summer Theater, a program "dramatizing episodes in the life of a small town druggist."

Later career

O'Brien's movie career slowed considerably by the early 1950s, although he still managed to get work in television. In his autobiography, The Wind at My Back, he professed to being completely flummoxed about the decline of his career. His close friend, Spencer Tracy, fought with his studio, MGM, to get roles for O'Brien in his films The People Against O'Hara (1951) and The Last Hurrah (1958).

He still had leads in films like Okinawa (1952), Inside Detroit (1956) and Kill Me Tomorrow (1957). In 1959 O'Brien appeared in a supporting role in one of his best-known movies as a police detective opposite George Raft in Some Like It Hot, starring Marilyn Monroe, Jack Lemmon, and Tony Curtis.

In his later years, O'Brien often worked in television. He was cast in 1956 and 1957 in four episodes of the religion anthology series, Crossroads. In three of the four programs, he played priests. He also performed in two episodes of The Virginian in the mid-1960s. In the 1960–1961 television season, O'Brien played James Harrigan, Sr. in a sitcom titled Harrigan and Son.

O'Brien made numerous appearances on television as himself, including several on The Ed Sullivan Show. In 1957, he guest starred in the first season of the NBC variety program, The Ford Show, Starring Tennessee Ernie Ford. Other shows in which he appeared as himself include the interview programs: The David Frost Show, The Tonight Show, The Merv Griffin Show, and The Joey Bishop Show. In 1957, Ralph Edwards profiled O'Brien's life and career for an episode of This Is Your Life. He was also the mystery guest on the game show What's My Line? in 1953 and 1957. In the "Jennifer and the Will" episode of WKRP in Cincinnati, he has a memorably comic turn as Jennifer Marlowe's elderly boyfriend. Shortly thereafter, O'Brien's final filmed performance came in a 1982 episode of Happy Days.

O'Brien spoke the Star Spangled Banner to the accompaniment of Doc Severinsen on trumpet for the National Anthem opening of Super Bowl IV in 1970. He was invited to do this because of his role as Knute Rockne.

He had a small role as Burt Reynolds' father in the 1978 comedy film The End, opposite Myrna Loy, cast as Reynolds' mother.

In later years, O'Brien recalled that he had had three "great" movie roles in his career: Knute Rockne, Hildy Johnson in The Front Page, and Father Duffy in The Fighting 69th.

From the 1960s through the early 1980s, O'Brien often traveled around the United States as a one-man act and in road shows. He also performed frequently in nightclubs.

Near the end of his life, he toured in a stage production of On Golden Pond, which he considered "absolutely the best play" he had ever read.

"Irish Mafia"
In the late 1930s, O'Brien and a small group of his actor friends began to meet to converse and exchange opinions and stories. Hollywood columnist Sidney Skolsky dubbed them the "Irish Mafia," but they preferred to call their social group the "Boys Club." In addition to O'Brien, the original members of the club were James Cagney, Spencer Tracy, Allen Jenkins and Frank McHugh, all of whom were Irish-Americans. Later Lynne Overman joined their group and then George Brent, James Dunn, Louis Calhern, William Gargan, Paul Kelly, Regis Toomey, Brian Donlevy, Ralph Bellamy, Lloyd Nolan and Frank Morgan.  James Gleason and Bert Lahr were also frequent guests. The actors gathered to socialize, but they also occasionally used the group to discuss ideas about their latest movies. By the mid-1940s the group began to break up, as members either moved or died. Some of the surviving members kept in contact by telephone and occasional meetings.

Personal life 

O'Brien and his wife, Eloise, had four children: Mavourneen, Sean, Terry, and Brigid. Three of his children were adopted. The youngest, Brigid O'Brien (born 1946), was his biological child. Eloise O'Brien occasionally appeared on stage with her husband.

Among those who knew him personally, O'Brien was known for his love of storytelling, jokes, and late-night parties. Bob Hope specifically remembered him as a raconteur. Another friend recalled that he was always "the life, and I mean the lively life, of the party." He traveled to Vietnam as part of a US tour in February 1969.

O'Brien died on October 15, 1983, from a heart attack at age 83, following minor prostate surgery. President Ronald Reagan released a White House statement noting his sadness over his old friend's death. The president had called the actor at the hospital just days before his death.

Filmography

Short Subjects:
A Dream Comes True (1935)
A Trip Thru a Hollywood Studio (1935)
Swingtime in the Movies (1938)
Out Where the Stars Begin (1938)
Screen Snapshots: Famous Fathers and Sons (1946)
Screen Snapshots: Hollywood's Happy Homes (1949)
Screen Snapshots: Motion Picture Mothers, Inc. (1949)
Screen Snapshots: Hopalong in Hoppy Land (1951)
Screen Snapshots: Memorial to Al Jolson (1952)
Screen Snapshots: Hollywood Mothers and Fathers (1955)
Screen Snapshots: Hollywood Beauty (1955)

Television credits
Place the Face (CBS television series, March 11, 1954)
Crossroads (three episodes, 1955–1957) as Father Patrick O'Neil /  Father Edward Sullivan /  Father Jim /  Father Edmund Boyle
Science Fiction Theatre (1955) (Are We Invaded?) as Dr. Arnold
What's My Line? (10/13/1957) (Episode #384) (Season 9, Ep 7) as Mystery Guest
Joyful Hour (1960, TV Movie) as Host
Harrigan and Son (1960–1961) as James Harrigan Sr.
Going My Way in "The Boss of the Ward" (1963) as Frank McCaffey
Hazel (1966) as Uncle Jerome Van Meter
The Over-the-Hill Gang (1969, TV Movie) as Capt. Oren Hayes
Welcome Home, Johnny Bristol (1972, TV Movie) as Sgt. McGll
Adventures of Nick Carter (1972, TV Movie) as Hallelujah Harry (unsold pilot)
McCloud (1973) as Mac Ferguson
Kiss Me, Kill Me (1976, TV Movie) as Jimmy, morgue attendant
Scout's Honor (1980, TV Movie) as Mr. Caboose
WKRP In Cincinnati (1981) as Col. H. Buchanan
Happy Days (1980–1982) as Uncle Joe (final appearance)

Radio appearances

Further reading
Wise, James. Stars in Blue: Movie Actors in America's Sea Services. Annapolis, MD: Naval Institute Press, 1997.

References

External links

 
 
 

1899 births
1983 deaths
20th-century American male actors
American Academy of Dramatic Arts alumni
American male comedy actors
United States Navy personnel of World War I
American male film actors
American male radio actors
American male stage actors
American people of Irish descent
American Roman Catholics
Burials at Holy Cross Cemetery, Culver City
California Republicans
Daytime Emmy Award winners
Male actors from Milwaukee
Marquette University alumni
Warner Bros. contract players
Columbia Pictures contract players
RKO Pictures contract players
Wisconsin Republicans
Marquette University High School alumni